Jagjivan Ram Shramik Mahavidyalaya, also known as J.R.S. College,  established in 1956, is a general degree college in Munger, Bihar. It is a constituent college of Tilka Manjhi Bhagalpur University, and offers undergraduate courses in science, arts and commerce.

Departments

Science

Chemistry
Physics 
Mathematics
Zoology
Botany

Arts 

English
Hindi
Bangla
Economics
Political Science
Philosophy
History

Accreditation
Jagjivan Ram Shramik Mahavidyalaya was accredited by the National Assessment and Accreditation Council (NAAC).

References

External links
 

Colleges affiliated to Tilka Manjhi Bhagalpur University
Education in Munger district
Educational institutions established in 1956
Universities and colleges in Bihar
1956 establishments in Bihar